is the 25th single by Japanese singer/songwriter Chisato Moritaka. The lyrics were written by Chisato Moritaka, the music was composed and arranged by Hideo Saitō. The single was released by One Up Music on February 10, 1995. The song was used as the theme of the NTV drama series .

Background 
The single cover was photographed in Italy. At the time of the single's release, One Up Music became a fully independent label after Up-Front Group purchased Warner Music Japan's half of the joint venture.

Moritaka performed the song on the 46th Kōhaku Uta Gassen.

Music video 
The black-and-white music video features Moritaka performing both vocals and drums simultaneously as two people. A color version of the video was also released.

Chart performance 
"Futari wa Koibito" peaked at No. 5 on Oricon's singles chart and sold 444,000 copies, becoming Moritaka's biggest selling single. It was also certified Platinum by the RIAJ.

Other versions 
Moritaka re-recorded the song and uploaded the video on her YouTube channel on November 5, 2012. This version is also included in Moritaka's 2013 self-covers DVD album Love Vol. 3.

Track listing

Personnel 
 Chisato Moritaka – vocals, drums, cowbell
 Hideo Saitō – guitar, synthesizer, tambourine, backing vocals
 Yuichi Takahashi – guitar
 Yasuhiko Fukuda – piano
 Yasuaki Maejima – piano
 Yukio Seto – bass

Chart positions

Certification

References

External links 
 
 
 

1995 singles
1995 songs
Japanese-language songs
Japanese television drama theme songs
Chisato Moritaka songs
Songs with lyrics by Chisato Moritaka
Songs with music by Hideo Saitō (musician, born 1958)
One Up Music singles